Philipp Ludwig Statius Müller (25 April 1725 – 5 January 1776) was a German zoologist.

Statius Müller was born in Esens, and was a professor of natural science at Erlangen. Between 1773 and 1776, he published a German translation of  Linnaeus's Natursystem. The supplement in 1776 contained the first scientific classification for a number of species, including the dugong, guanaco, potto, tricolored heron, umbrella cockatoo, red-vented cockatoo, and the enigmatic hoatzin. He was also an entomologist.

Müller died in Erlangen.

He is not to be confused with Salomon Müller (1804–1864), also an ornithologist, or with Otto Friedrich Müller.

Works
Statius Müller, P. L. 1776. Des Ritters Carl von Linné Königlich Schwedischen Leibarztes &c. &c. vollständigen Natursystems Supplements- und Register-Band über alle sechs Theile oder Classen des Thierreichs. Mit einer ausführlichen Erklärung. Nebst drey Kupfertafeln.Nürnberg. (Raspe).

References
Anonym 1776: [Muller, P. L. S.]  Besch. Berlin. Ges. Naturf. Fr. 2 584-592
Evenhuis, N. L. 1997 Litteratura taxonomica dipterorum (1758-1930). Volume 1 (A-K); Volume 2 (L-Z). Leiden, Backhuys Publishers.

German entomologists
German ornithologists
1725 births
1776 deaths
German taxonomists
People from Erlangen
18th-century German zoologists
18th-century German male writers